The World Around Us was an Australian documentary television series that aired on the Seven Network between 1979 until 2006. It regularly showed documentaries which featured the likes of   Malcolm Douglas and Sir David Attenborough.

Presenters 

The regular hosts included John Riddell, Ernie Dingo, Ann Sanders, Scott Lambert, Lisa McCune, Frank Warrick, Kay McGrath.

Seven Network original programming
1970s Australian documentary television series
1980s Australian documentary television series
1990s Australian documentary television series
2000s Australian documentary television series
1979 Australian television series debuts
2006 Australian television series endings